Rinaldini is an Italian last name diffused over all in Tuscany, Emilia-Romagna and Marche. Rinaldini is a diminutive of "Rinaldo" that come from France. "Rinaldo" is "Reinaud" and "Renaud" in French language, "Reinold" in deutsch language, "Reginald" in English language. Rinaldo mean two different kind of figures: the consultant and/or the ballad singer.

Aristide Rinaldini, (1844–1920), Italian Catholic cardinal
Mattia Rinaldini, Italian footballer